Miroslav Aleksandrovich Lobantsev (born 27 May 1995) is a Russian professional football player whose plays as a goalkeeper for FC Kyzylzhar.

Club career
He made his debut in the Russian Premier League on 20 July 2012 for Lokomotiv Moscow in a game against Mordovia Saransk.

6 March 2020, FC Kyzylzhar announced the signing of Lobantsev.

Career statistics

Club

References

External links

1995 births
Living people
Russian footballers
FC Lokomotiv Moscow players
PFC Krylia Sovetov Samara players
FC Rotor Volgograd players
FC Kyzylzhar players
Russian expatriate footballers
Expatriate footballers in Kazakhstan
Russian Premier League players
Kazakhstan Premier League players
Footballers from Moscow
Russia youth international footballers
Russia under-21 international footballers
Association football goalkeepers